Hưng Yên is a city in Vietnam. It is the provincial capital of Hưng Yên Province and is a third-graded city according to Vietnam's city classification table.

Geography
Hưng Yên is a delta city. It is located in the south of Hưng Yên Province, on the left bank (north bank) of the Red River in the northern part of Vietnam. Hưng Yên is about 60 km away from Hanoi.
Hưng Yên borders Kim Động District to the north and Tiên Lữ District to the east. The Red River is the natural boundary between Hưng Yên and Hà Nam Province's Lý Nhân District and Duy Tiên District.
Area: 46.80 km2 (4,685.51 ha)

Demography
Population: 121,486 people (2008)

Administration
Hưng Yên administers 12 administrative divisions:

7 wards (phường): Lê Lợi, Quang Trung, Minh Khai, Hiến Nam, Lam Sơn, Hồng Châu and An Tảo.
5 communes (xã): Bảo Khê, Trung Nghĩa, Liên Phương, Hồng Nam and Quảng Châu.

Tourism

The city is well known in the world (especially with historians) with Phố Hiến (an ancient port-city located in the area). There are still a lot of ancient Asian temples, pagodas and other religious buildings here.

Nhãn lồng (caged longan - a kind of fruit) is one of Hưng Yên's specialities.

Climate

See also
 Hưng Yên Specialist High School
 Temple of Literature, Hưng Yên.

References

Populated places in Hưng Yên province
Provincial capitals in Vietnam
Districts of Hưng Yên province
Cities in Vietnam